Ann Harada (born 21 March 1977) is a Canadian former field hockey player.

Harada was born in Richmond, British Columbia.

References

1977 births
Living people
Canadian female field hockey players
Field hockey people from British Columbia
People from Richmond, British Columbia
Field hockey players at the 1998 Commonwealth Games
Commonwealth Games competitors for Canada
20th-century Canadian women
21st-century Canadian women